Classification is a process related to categorization, the process in which ideas and objects are recognized, differentiated and understood. 
Classification is the grouping of related facts into classes. 
It may also refer to:

Business, organizations, and economics
 Classification of customers, for marketing (as in Master data management) or for profitability (e.g. by Activity-based costing) 
 Classified information, as in legal or government documentation
 Job classification, as in job analysis
 Standard Industrial Classification, economic activities

Mathematics
 Attribute-value system, a basic knowledge representation framework
 Classification theorems in mathematics
 Mathematical classification, grouping mathematical objects based on a property that all those objects share
 Statistical classification, identifying to which of a set of categories a new observation belongs, on the basis of a training set of data

Media
 Classification (literature), a figure of speech linking a proper noun to a common noun using the or other articles
 Decimal classification, decimal classification systems
 Document classification, a problem in library science, information science and computer science
 Classified information, sensitive information to which access is restricted by law or regulation to particular classes of people
 Library classification, a system of coding, assorting and organizing library materials according to their subject
 Image classification in computer vision
 Motion picture rating system, for film classification

Science
 Scientific classification (disambiguation)
 Biological classification of organisms
 Chemical classification
 Medical classification, the process of transforming descriptions of medical diagnoses and procedures into universal medical code numbers
 Taxonomic classification, also known as classification of species
Cladistics, an approach using similarities

Organizations involved in classification
 International Society for Knowledge Organization

Other uses
 An industrial process such as mechanical screening for sorting materials by size, shape, and density, etc.
 Civil service classification, personnel grades in government
 Classification of swords
 Classification of wine
 Classification society, a non-governmental organization that establishes and maintains technical standards for the construction and operation of ships and offshore structures
 Locomotive classification
 Product classification
 Security classification, information to which access is restricted by law or regulation

See also
 Class (disambiguation)
 Classified (disambiguation)
 Classifier (disambiguation)
 Data classification (disambiguation)
 Order
 Taxonomy

External links

 
Former disambiguation pages converted to set index articles